Eliyahu Baruchi (born 22 January 1976) is an Israeli Haredi rabbi and politician currently serving as a member of the Knesset for the United Torah Judaism alliance. He previously held the position in three spells during 2020 and 2021.

Biography
Baruchi was born in Ashdod and studied at the Torah yeshiva in Jerusalem. After marrying, he studied at Kollel Abraham in Herzliya and Petah Tikva. In 2008 he was appointed chair of the Petah Tikva branch of Degel HaTorah. He was elected onto Petah Tikva city council and became deputy mayor.

He was placed tenth on the United Torah Judaism list for the April 2019 election, but UTJ won only eight seats. He was placed tenth again for the September 2019 election, in which UTJ were reduced to seven seats. Although he missed out again in the March 2020 election in which he retained the tenth slot and UTJ again won seven seats, he entered the Knesset on 24 June 2020 as a replacement for Uri Maklev, who had resigned his seat under the Norwegian Law after being appointed to the cabinet. He left the Knesset on 15 September 2020 when Yaakov Litzman returned after resigning from the cabinet, but re-entered it on 14 October as a replacement for Eliyahu Hasid. He was placed ninth on the UTJ list for the 2021 election, losing his seat as the alliance won seven seats. He regained his seat when Uri Maklev resigned his own seat under the Norwegian Law, but left the Knesset again in June when a new government was formed without United Torah Judaism and Maklev returned to the Knesset.

Baruchi was placed ninth on the UTJ list for the 2022 election, and returned to the Knesset on 25 January 2023 under the Norwegian Law.

References

External links

1976 births
Living people
Israeli Orthodox Jews
Degel HaTorah politicians
Haredi rabbis in Israel
Jewish Israeli politicians
Members of the 23rd Knesset (2020–2021)
Members of the 24th Knesset (2021–2022)
Members of the 25th Knesset (2022–)
People from Ashdod
Rabbinic members of the Knesset
United Torah Judaism politicians